Plantation may refer to:

 Plantation, large farm or estate
 Plantation complexes in the Southern United States
 Plantation (settlement or colony), early method of colonization
 Plantations of Ireland

United States places
 Plantation Estate, the Winter White House of President Barack Obama, in Hawaii
 Plantation, Florida (disambiguation): a city in SE Florida, an island in SW Florida, and a few smaller communities
 Plantation, Kentucky, city in Jefferson County, Kentucky
 Plantation (Maine), a type of minor civil division
 Providence Plantations, the first permanent European American settlement in Rhode Island
 Colony of Rhode Island and Providence Plantations, one of the original Thirteen Colonies established on the east coast of America, bordering the Atlantic Ocean
 State of Rhode Island and Providence Plantations, former official name of the State of Rhode Island

Other
 Plantation, Glasgow, an area of the city of Glasgow, Scotland
 Plantation Records, a defunct American country music label
 The Plantation, a 2000 novel by Chris Kuzneski

See also
 :Category:Plantations